"Fake Woke" is a song written, produced, and performed by Canadian rapper Tom MacDonald. It was self-released as a single on January 29, 2021. A music video for the song, directed by his girlfriend and fellow Canadian musician Nova Rockafeller, was released simultaneously with the single. The American conservative news television channel Fox News promoted "Fake Woke" on its series The Story with Martha MacCallum and interviewed MacDonald about the song.

Music and lyrics
The song begins with an isolated clean electric guitar. In the song's introduction, MacDonald disses American rapper Cardi B, criticizing her for being perceived as a role model. He also takes a stand against the idea that white privilege exists and against the activist group Black Lives Matter, rapping, "I think Black Lives Matter was the stupidest name / When the system screwing everyone exactly the same."
Macdonald also says that the left wing is "Fake Woke", hence the title of the song. However, he also criticizes the right wing in the line, "[People] hate their neighbour 'cause he wears a mask or he stays home/ Has a daughter but his favorite artist said he slays hoes/picks her up from school, music slaps on the way home."
Macdonald also criticizes censorship for being biased, saying, "Censorship's an issue 'cause they choose what they erase/There's a difference between hate speech and speech that you hate."

Credits and personnel
Credits adapted from Tidal.
 Tom MacDonald - composer, producer, songwriter
 Evan Morgan - mixing and mastering

Charts

Weekly charts

Year-end charts

Release history

References

2021 singles
2021 songs
Canadian hip hop songs
Diss tracks
Protest songs
Conservative media in Canada